First Parish Church in Arlington, Massachusetts is a Unitarian-Universalist congregation, which was founded in 1678 as First Parish in West Cambridge. It merged with the Arlington Universalist Congregation in 1962. The Highrock Church building originally housed the Universalist church in Arlington, one of the congregations joined in 1961 with the formation of the  Unitarian Universalist Association, with the Unitarian congregation at the corner of Pleasant and Massachusetts Avenue.

See also 
 First Parish Website
 First Parish Church Parsonage

Buildings and structures in Arlington, Massachusetts
Unitarian Universalist churches in Massachusetts
Churches in Middlesex County, Massachusetts